The Fourth Ministry of Machine Building (中华人民共和国第四机械工业部), one of the central offices in the People's Republic of China, who oversaw the electronics industry.

It was established in 1963. In March 1993, became part of the Ministry of Machine Building and Electronics Industries. In March 1998, an independent Ministry of the Electronics Industry.

See also
First Ministry of Machine-Building of the PRC
Second Ministry of Machine-Building of the PRC, ministry of nuclear industry
Third Ministry of Machine-Building of the PRC, ministry of aviation industry
Fifth Ministry of Machine-Building of the PRC, ministry of tank equipment and artillery
Sixth Ministry of Machine-Building of the PRC, ministry of shipbuilding
Seventh Ministry of Machine-Building of the PRC, ministry of space industry
Eighth Ministry of Machine-Building of the PRC

Bibliography
 Malcolm Lamb: Directory of officials and Organizations in China, ME Sharpe Inc. Armonk, NY, 2003, p. 1911 +, Volume 1
 China's Economic System, Routledge Abingdon 2005, 594 p., 

Government ministries of the People's Republic of China